Kommunistisk Universitetslag (KUL), founded in 1973, was a revolutionary student organisation with a basis in the philosophy and social economics departments of the University of Oslo in the 1970s. They had a theoretical schooling in Marxism. KUL considered the AKP(m-l) as a parochial organisation and stated that a Marxist analysis meant that individual groups must join together to form a reactionary class. They also criticised the AKP(m-l) for their nationalism and militarism, and defined themselves to the left of the party. KUL published the university newspaper Gnisten.

KUL worked together with the Kommunistisk Arbeiderforbund (KA) and aligned themselves with the student organisation. KUL also worked together for a short time with the Kommunistiske Arbeidsgrupper (KAG) at the University of Bergen.

At its foundation, KUL was aligned with a national communist Leninism. In time, the organisation, similarly to the AKP(m-l), aligned itself to the politics of the People's Republic of China, which defined itself differently from and opposed to Soviet-Communism after the De-Stalinization. KUL later went on to criticise the change in the politics of China after the death of Mao Zedong in 1976, and went on for a short time to support the systems in Albania and other socialist countries.

KUL were generally critical of Soviet communism both under and after Stalin, in contrast to the overwhelmingly positive attitudes towards  Stalin in the KA. The first splits with the KA came in winter 1980. The KUL then ceased their political activity, starting from 1981.

KUL were strongest in Oslo, but also had branches in Tromsø, Trondheim and Ås, but not in Bergen, although parts of the (KAG) often joined together with them. Although the KUL always remained a small group, there were many members who went on to greater cultural, intellectual, and political careers. Among the best known are Espen Søbye, Gerd-Liv Valla, Harald Berntsen, Jørgen Sandemose, Truls Wyller, Knut Erik Aagaard, Jo Sivertsen, Sissel Myklebust, Ole Jacob Bull, Jon Langdal and Nils Johan Ringdal.

External links
Valla, Clemet og Stalin by Knut Erik Aagaard (Tidens Tegn 5-97).
STEMTE FOR STALIN by Vidar Helgesen.
Ingen har rene hender, debattinnlegg i Dagsavisen by Truls Wyller.

Political advocacy groups in Norway
University of Oslo
Communism in Norway
1973 establishments in Norway
1981 disestablishments in Norway